Isaac Richards may refer to:

 Isaac Richards (bishop) (1859–1936), Anglican bishop in New Zealand
 Isaac Richards (soccer) (born 1999), Australian footballer